Bogusław  (formerly German Batzlow) is a village in the administrative district of Gmina Dębno, within Myślibórz County, West Pomeranian Voivodeship, in north-western Poland.

The village has a population of 266.

See also
 History of Pomerania

References 

Villages in Myślibórz County